The 2020 Coca-Cola 600, the 61st running of the event, was a NASCAR Cup Series race held at Charlotte Motor Speedway in Concord, North Carolina, which started on May 24 and concluded in the early hours of May 25, 2020.

The seventh race of the 2020 NASCAR Cup Series season, the Coca-Cola 600 was scheduled to be held over 400 laps of the  asphalt speedway, but following a late-race spin by William Byron, a caution period took the race into an overtime finish. Brad Keselowski took the victory after 405 laps had been completed; the  completed was the longest race distance in NASCAR history.

Report

Background

The race was held at Charlotte Motor Speedway, located in Concord, North Carolina. The speedway complex includes a  quad-oval track that was utilized for the race, as well as a dragstrip and a dirt track. The speedway was built in 1959 by Bruton Smith and is considered the home track for NASCAR with many race teams based in the Charlotte metropolitan area. The track is owned and operated by Speedway Motorsports Inc. (SMI) with Marcus G. Smith serving as track president.

All four stages were scheduled to consist of 100 laps.

The race was held behind closed doors to an extent, with no spectators admitted in the grandstands. However, owners of the condominiums overlooking turn 1 of the track were able to watch the race from their residences (restricted to up to five per residence for social distancing requirements), for a maximum of 260 fans.  As one of the first major events to allow limited spectators, tickets to the event, which are available only through ownership of the units, the asking price for two nights in a unit and tickets were offered on short-term vacation rental sites with an asking price of minimum $7,802.

Entry list
 (R) denotes rookie driver.
 (i) denotes driver who are ineligible for series driver points.

Qualifying

Qualifying results

Race

Stage Results

Stage One
Laps: 100

Stage Two
Laps: 100

Stage Three
Laps: 100

Final Stage Results

Stage Four
Laps: 100

Race statistics
 Lead changes: 20 among 11 different drivers
 Cautions/Laps: 8 for 52
 Red flags: 1 for 1 hour, 8 minutes and 35 seconds
 Time of race: 4 hours, 29 minutes and 55 seconds
 Average speed:

Media

Television
Fox Sports televised the race in the United States for the 20th consecutive year. Mike Joy and three-time Coca-Cola 600 winner, Jeff Gordon covered the race from the Steve Byrnes Studio in Charlotte. Jamie Little and Regan Smith handled the pit road duties. Larry McReynolds provided insight from the Fox Sports studio in Charlotte.

Radio
Radio coverage of the race was broadcast by the Performance Racing Network (PRN), and was simulcasted on Sirius XM NASCAR Radio. Doug Rice and Mark Garrow called the race in the booth when the field raced through the quad-oval. Rob Albright called the race from a billboard in turn 2 when the field was racing through turns 1 and 2 and halfway down the backstretch. Pat Patterson called the race from a billboard outside of turn 3 when the field raced through the other half of the backstretch and through turns 3 and 4. Brad Gillie, Brett McMillan and Wendy Venturini were the pit reporters during the broadcast.

Standings after the race

Drivers' Championship standings

Manufacturers' Championship standings

Note: Only the first 16 positions are included for the driver standings.
. – Driver has clinched a position in the NASCAR Cup Series playoffs.

Notes

References

Coca-Cola 600
Coca-Cola 600
Coca-Cola 600
NASCAR races at Charlotte Motor Speedway